Jean-Henrik Martell (born 4 April 1949) is a Swedish rower. He competed in the men's double sculls event at the 1976 Summer Olympics.

References

1949 births
Living people
Swedish male rowers
Olympic rowers of Sweden
Rowers at the 1976 Summer Olympics
Sportspeople from Budapest